The Ugandan lowland shrew or Moon shrew, (Crocidura selina) is a species of mammal in the family Soricidae. It is found in Kenya and Uganda. Its natural habitats are subtropical or tropical swamps and montane forests.

References

 Hutterer, R., Oguge, N. & Howell, K. 2004.  Crocidura selina.   2006 IUCN Red List of Threatened Species.   Downloaded on 30 July 2007.

Crocidura
Mammals described in 1915
Taxonomy articles created by Polbot